Skogså IF is a Swedish football club located in the Boden municipality.

Background
Skogså IF currently plays in Division 4 Norrbotten Norra which is the sixth tier of Swedish football. They play their home matches at the Boden Arena in Boden and Åvallen in Skogså during summertime.

The club is affiliated to Norrbottens Fotbollförbund.

Season to season

Footnotes

External links
 Skogså IF – Official website
 Skogså IF on Facebook

Sport in Norrbotten County
Football clubs in Norrbotten County
1942 establishments in Sweden